Chicken Rhythms is the only full-length studio album by English band Northside. It was released in 1991 and was produced by Ian Broudie.

The songs "Shall We Take a Trip" and "Moody Places" were used as the theme tune on Granada Soccer Night between 1990 and 1992.

Track listing 

 Take 5 (4:12)
 Weight of Air (5:55)
 Funky Munky (3:11)
 A Change is on its Way (5:13)
 Yeah Man (4:55)
 Tour de World (3:41)
 Wishful Thinking (4:18)
 Shall We Take a Trip (4:25)
 Who's to Blame (3:34)
 Practise Makes Perfect (3:00)
 My Rising Star (4:22) (CD only)

References 

1991 debut albums
Northside (band) albums
Factory Records albums
Albums produced by Ian Broudie